Andrew Harms, better known as harms, is a radio personality and television host based in Los Angeles.

Career 

While getting a business degree at the University of Washington, Harms started working at 107.7 The End as a modulator. Within a year he was on-air as a weekend and overnight DJ, though he continued to work in the promotions department as street team coordinator. He eventually moved from nights and weekends to evening drive. He was later promoted to the station's music director, and in 2008 replaced outgoing Assistant Program Director Jim Keller.

In December 2012 Harms accepted an offer from Sean "Diddy" Combs to help launch Revolt TV, a new music TV network but seen over 25 million homes. Hired as the director of music programming, he specialized in alternative, electronic and pop genres, and was responsible for identifying music videos and related content. From October 2013 –  October 2014, he hosted, wrote and programmed a daily half-hour show on the network called “In Harms Way", and co-hosted the network's flagship show "Revolt Live".

After two and half years at Revolt, Harms accepted an opportunity to return to radio full-time at LA's Alt 98.7, where he currently hosts weekday afternoons in LA and Seattle from 3–7 pm, and serves as the station's assistant program director and music director. During Harms's time there, Alt 98.7 has become one of the top three stations for people 18-34 in LA. Harms also hosts national television broadcasts for iHeartRadio around the world, most recently with U2, Muse, Mumford & Sons and The Red Hot Chili Peppers

Harms is currently:
Afternoon Drive Host from 3-7 pm on ALT 98.7 in Los Angeles
Afternoon Drive Host from 3-7 pm on ALT 102.9 in Seattle
Assistant Program Director and Music Director for ALT 98.7 in Los Angeles
National Broadcast Host for iHeart Media video series iHeart Radio Live

He is also known for his work as:
The host of The Experience Music Project's Sound Off! Competition from 2004 to 2012
Nightly Nirvana, ten-week nationally syndicated radio special on over 50 stations (2004)
Director of Music Programing at Revolt TV
Host of In Harms Way on Revolt TV (185 Episodes)
Host of Seattle's Sound by the Sound on Revolt TV  (40 Episodes)
Appearances on KTLA TV in Los Angeles
14 years as a DJ at 107.7 The End in Seattle
Music Director and Assistant Program Director at 107.7 The End in Seattle

Accomplishments 
2004 FMQB Specialty Host of the Year
Leaked an early version of Fiona Apple's "Extraordinary Machine" to national reception  
Billboard named Harms the #6 rock radio programmer in the country in 2016.
First DJ in the United States to play Muse, Chvrches, and The Killers among many others
First and Only Three-Time Consecutive Fantasy Football Champion in the Forkhand League

References
1077TheEnd.com
KNDD-FM Public File

Year of birth missing (living people)
Place of birth missing (living people)
Living people
American radio personalities
University of Washington Foster School of Business alumni